Heikki Liedes (born January 12, 1993) is a Finnish professional ice hockey player. He is currently playing with Lukko in the Finnish Liiga.

Liedes made his Liiga debut playing with KalPa during the 2013–14 Liiga season.

References

External links

1993 births
Living people
Finnish ice hockey forwards
HPK players
KalPa players
KooKoo players
Lukko players
Ice hockey people from Helsinki
Tri-City Storm players